The Andy's Frozen Custard 300 is a NASCAR Xfinity Series stock car race that takes place at Texas Motor Speedway in Fort Worth, Texas.

History

The race came about from the results of the Ferko lawsuit in 2004. With Darlington Raceway forced to forfeit its Southern 500 weekend as a result of the lawsuit, TMS gained a second weekend on the schedule for the NASCAR Cup Series and Xfinity Series racing, and fifth race for the NASCAR Xfinity Series playoffs. 

The 2008 race was won by Kyle Busch, breaking Kevin Harvick's string of three consecutive wins in this race.

In 2021, the race gained sponsorship from Andy's Frozen Custard and was branded the Andy's Frozen Custard 335 to celebrate the company's 35th anniversary. Despite the number that represents the distance in the name being changed from 300 to 335, the actual length remained 300 miles. It was only 335 as a promotion for their anniversary. The event in 2022 will be titled the Andy's Frozen Custard 300.

Past winners

2010: Race extended due to NASCAR overtime.

Multiple winners (drivers)

Multiple winners (teams)

Manufacturer wins

References

External links
 

2005 establishments in Texas
NASCAR Xfinity Series races
NASCAR races at Texas Motor Speedway
Recurring sporting events established in 2005
Annual sporting events in the United States